The 2017–18 1. FC Schweinfurt 05 season was the 113th season in the history of the association football club based in Schweinfurt, Germany. In addition to the domestic league, Schweinfurt also participated in the 2017–18 DFB-Pokal, and in the season's edition of the Bavarian Cup. This was the 82nd season for Schweinfurt in the Willy-Sachs-Stadion. The season covered a period from 1 July 2017 to 30 June 2018.

Players

Squad

Competitions

Regionalliga Bayern

Results by round

Matches
League fixtures as announced by BFV:

DFB-Pokal

DFB-Pokal fixtures as announced by DFB:

Bavarian Cup

Bavarian Cup fixtures as announced by BFV:

References

1. FC Schweinfurt 05 seasons
Schweinfurt